Girl Without a Room is a 1933 American pre-Code musical comedy film starring Charles Farrell, Charles Ruggles, and Marguerite Churchill.  This early light comedy farce set in Paris was written by Claude Binyon, Frank Butler, and Jack Lait, and directed by Ralph Murphy.

As well as featuring some scenes with dialogue rendered in rhyming couplets, the film is notable as an example of Hollywood's attitude to abstract art in the 1930s. The hero is a no-nonsense representational artist from Tennessee, who, transplanted to Paris, meets a crowd of pretentious types in a Montparnasse garret. Chief among them is an artist who believes in depicting the soul of an object rather than the object itself. Played by comic star Charlie Ruggles, his name is "Crock" (one of the meanings of which, ironically, is scam or con, in American vernacular English).

Plot

Cast
 Charles Farrell as Tom Duncan
 Charles Ruggles as Vergil Crock
 Marguerite Churchill as Kay Loring
 Gregory Ratoff as Serge Alexovich
 Walter Woolf King as Arthur Copeland
 Mischa Auer as Walksky
 Grace Bradley as Nada

External links
 

1933 films
American black-and-white films
American musical comedy films
Films directed by Ralph Murphy
1933 musical comedy films
Films set in Paris
1930s English-language films
1930s American films